Arbaaz Salim Abdul Rashid Khan (born 4 August 1967) is an Indian actor and film producer who primarily works in Hindi cinema, in addition to Telugu, Urdu and Malayalam cinema.

Since making his debut in 1996, he has acted in many leading and supporting roles. He ventured into film production in Bollywood film industry, with Arbaaz Khan Productions, launched with Dabangg (2010), in which he starred as the younger brother of his real-life brother Salman Khan. The film went on to become one of the highest-grossing Bollywood films of all time. He also won the National Film Award for Best Popular Film Providing Wholesome Entertainment for the same. He also hosted the reality show Power Couple, which aired on Sony TV. In 2019, Khan made his digital debut with the crime-thriller web series Poison.

Early life and family

Khan was born as the second son into a family with strong ties to the Bollywood film industry; his father is Salim Khan, a successful screenwriter, and his mother is Sushila Charak (now known as Salma Khan), while his stepmother is dancer and Bollywood actress Helen Khan. He is the brother of Bollywood actor Salman Khan—with whom he attended the Scindia School, Gwalior—and actor-producer Sohail Khan. He has one sister Alvira Khan (now known as Alvira Khan Agnihotri) and an adopted sister Arpita Khan. His brother-in-law is actor Atul Agnihotri and Aayush Sharma.

Acting career

Khan made his debut in the 1996 film Daraar in a villainous role of a psychotic wife-beater. He received the Filmfare Award for Best Performance in a Negative Role for his performance. He has starred in many multi-starrer hit films such as Pyaar Kiya To Darna Kya (1998), for which he received a Filmfare Award for Best Supporting Actor nomination, and Garv: Pride and Honour (2004) where he acted opposite his brother Salman.

He played a villainous role in the film Qayamat: City Under Threat (2003) which was also successful at the box office. He also played supporting roles in film director Priyadarshan's comedy films Hulchul (2004), Malamaal Weekly (2006) and Bhagam Bhag (2006). He played supporting roles as a police officer (Constable Javed Shaikh) and a mobster (Moscow Chikna) respectively in the multi-starrers Shootout at Lokhandwala and Fool and Final in 2007. He also made a cameo, alongside brother Sohail Khan, in the blockbuster Jaane Tu... Ya Jaane Na, starring Imran Khan and Genelia D'Souza. In 2009 he starred alongside Sohail in Kisaan and played the villain in Jai Veeru. Khan also appeared in the television serial Karishma - The Miracles of Destiny in 2003 and has appeared in many TV programs from time to time.

He also played the main villain in the Telugu film Jai Chiranjeeva starring Chiranjeevi. The movie was extensively shot in Los Angeles, California and Las Vegas.

In 2010, Khan ventured into film production, with Arbaaz Khan Productions and his first film as producer was Dabangg which released in September 2010. The film starred his brother Salman in the leading role as the anti-hero Chulbul Pandey, alongside Arbaaz as his younger brother Makhi. His former wife Malaika Arora Khan featured in the popular item number "Munni Badnaam". The film became a blockbuster within the first week of its release and broke several box office records, becoming the second highest grossing Bollywood film of all time at the time of its release. On 12 March 2011, while Khan was a special guest of Australia's Indian film festival, Bollywood & Beyond, he helped his former wife Malaika Arora lead a successful world record attempt in Melbourne. 1235 participants successfully performed a choreographed dance to "Munni Badnaam" from the Dabangg soundtrack.

Khan made his directorial debut with the 2012 released sequel Dabangg 2.

Khan is set to make his Malayalam debut in Big Brother starring Mohanlal.

Personal life 

Khan married model and actress Malaika Arora in 1998. They have a son, Arhaan Khan, born in 2002. The couple announced their separation on 28 March 2016 and officially got divorced on 11 May 2017.

Controversies

Accident
On 1 July 2012, a 70-year-old woman was killed by a Land Cruiser owned by Khan, and the woman's family demanded compensation from the actor. However, the Khan family refused to pay compensation to the family, as the old woman had been disowned by her family.

Betting
In 2018, Arbaaz Khan confessed to having placed bets on Indian Premier League matches (IPL) in the previous five years. According to a police official, the Bollywood actor admitted that he had been betting on cricket matches for the past five to six years. Thane Police sources also informed that Arbaaz and the accused bookie—Sonu Jalan, a.k.a. Sonu Malad—were brought face-to-face during the interrogation. It was then that Arbaaz confessed about his betting involvement.

Sabotaging
Arbaaz Khan, his father Salim Khan, and his brothers Sohail and Salman have been accused by director, Abhinav Kashyap of sabotaging his film Besharam and his career. Abhinav had directed the Khans' blockbuster film Dabangg. Arbaaz Khan replied by saying that they are taking legal action against the said director.

Filmography

Film

Dubbing

Web series

Direction

Production 
Under the banner he has produced following films.

Awards and nominations

References

External links 

 
 
 
 Arbaaz Khan at Rotten Tomatoes

Indian male film actors
1967 births
Living people
Male actors in Hindi cinema
Film producers from Maharashtra
Male actors from Pune
Filmfare Awards winners
Scindia School alumni
Film directors from Maharashtra
Hindi film producers
Hindi-language film directors
Arbaaz
Producers who won the Best Popular Film Providing Wholesome Entertainment National Film Award